Tetilla capillosa, the furry sponge, is a species of demosponge from southern Africa.

Description 

This brown to grey-green sponge has a hemispherical to ovoid form. It has a single large oscule at the top. The cortex is undifferentiated.

Spicules 
The following spicules make up the skeleton of this species:

 Protriaenes (spicules with three short prongs projecting forwards from one end of a longer ray) and prodiaenes (two prongs instead of three) with straight branches pointing upwards. The part of the spicule from which the prongs protrude is  initially straight, but curves towards the base.
 Anatrienes (megasceleres with one long and three short rays) which may be curved towards the end.
 Straight oxeas (needle-like spicules with pointed ends) that are noticeable asymmetrical. 
 Very thin and slightly rough sigmaspires (spirally curved s-shaped spicules).

Skeleton 
Tracts of protriaenes, anatrienes and oxeas form a form a radial or spiral skeleton. They pierce the ectosome. These projecting spicules are soft and fuzzy. This is where the common name of the species comes from. Scattered oxeas are also present between these tracts. Sigmaspires are abundant throughout the sponge.

Distribution and habitat 
This species is found on the south and west coasts of southern Africa.

References 

Demospongiae
Species described in 1967
Biodiversity of South Africa